Club Deportivo Paracuellos Antamira, formerly known as Fútbol Alcobendas Sport is a Spanish football club based in Majadahonda, in the autonomous community of Madrid. Founded in 1995, it is the reserve team of CF Rayo Majadahonda and plays in Tercera División RFEF – Group 7, holding home games at Estadio La Oliva, which has a capacity of 1,500 spectators.

History 
Founded in 1995 as Soto de la Moraleja Club de Fútbol, Alcobendas first reached the fourth division in 2006–07, finishing in fourteenth position. Changing its name to Soto de Alcobendas Club de Fútbol in 2005, the team was again renamed the following year, to Alcobendas Sport, with the intention to cover the entire city.

In April 2020, Alcobendas announced an agreement with CF Rayo Majadahonda, and changed name to CD Paracuellos Antamira.

In 1970, another club in the city was founded, Alcobendas CF. It also competed in the same divisions.

Season to season
As Alcobendas Sport

As Paracuellos Antamira (Rayo Majadahonda's reserve team)

15 seasons in Tercera División
1 season in Tercera División RFEF

References

External links
Official website 
FF Madrid profile
Futbolme team profile 

Football clubs in the Community of Madrid
Association football clubs established in 1995
1995 establishments in Spain
Spanish reserve football teams
CF Rayo Majadahonda